North Macedonia is a country in Southeastern Europe.

North Macedonia may also refer to:
 North Macedonia (book), book issued in 1906 by the Bulgarian researcher Yordan Ivanov

See also
 Macedonia (disambiguation)
 Macedonia (region) for the wider region